Anita Rani Nazran (born 25 October 1977), better known as Anita Rani, is an English radio and television presenter.

Early life
Rani was born and brought up in Bradford, West Yorkshire to a Hindu father and a Sikh mother.

In an episode of Who Do You Think You Are? first broadcast on 1 October 2015 on BBC One, Rani investigated the history of her maternal grandfather Sant Singh (born Sant Ram, in Sarhali in 1916, died 1975), in particular learning more about his first wife and children, who died during the violence of the Partition of India in 1947, while he was a thousand miles away in Kirkee, serving in the British Indian Army, which he had joined in August 1942. Rani discovered that her maternal grandfather was born into a Hindu Taggar family, but converted to Sikhism as a young man in accordance with a custom prevalent at the time. He continued to serve in the Indian Army after Indian independence, retiring as a subedar (equivalent to a warrant officer) in 1970.

Rani was educated at Bradford Girls' Grammar School, an independent school. Rani developed an early interest in journalism, hosting her first show at the age of 14 on Sunrise Radio. She went to the University of Leeds, where she studied broadcasting.

Career
After leaving university Rani worked as a researcher for the BBC and other organisations.

In 2002, Rani presented The Edit, a live news and entertainment programme on Channel Five. She presented a number of pop shows on Five including Spring Break Live, Party in the Park and Pop City Live, as well as being a freelance journalist for 5 News. In Spring 2003, she fronted The State We're In, a satirical current affairs programme on BBC Three. She also presented the first Poetry Slam on the same channel. She was nominated as Best On Screen Personality at the Royal Television Society Midlands awards in 2005.

Rani joined the BBC Asian Network radio station in March 2005, and became presenter of the weekend Hot Breakfast show. From April 2006 to March 2007 she presented the weekday morning talkback programme Anita Rani on the BBC Asian Network on the station.

In 2005, she was a regular reporter on The Cricket Show on Channel 4. From 20 May 2006 she was a co-presenter of Desi DNA, an arts programme on BBC Two catering to the Desi (British Asian) community. She launched Destination Three, a late night entertainment zone on BBC Three. In May 2006, Rani joined Sky Sports where she became co-presenter with Simon Thomas on the Cricket AM show each Saturday morning.

Rani presented My Generation Next, shown on BBC News 24 between 2 and 9 December 2006. She covered for Anita Anand on the late evening weekday show on BBC Radio 5 Live in March and September 2007 and has presented World Have Your Say on the BBC World Service and Weekend Breakfast on Five Live. She has also covered on various shows for BBC Radio 6 Music. In August 2008, Rani was the co-presenter of Rogue Restaurants on BBC One and joined the team of roving reporters on The One Show. From 2 March 2009 she co-presented BBC One's Watchdog, succeeding Julia Bradbury.

From 2011 until 2015, Rani presented Four Rooms where unique objects are offered for sale to specialist dealers. In 2016, she was replaced by Sarah Beeny.

Rani co-presented with Justin Rowlatt a two-part documentary travelogue India on Four Wheels, a road trip around India sampling the changes and problems that growing car usage has brought to the country in the last two decades. This 2011 show was followed by similar collaborations with Rowlatt, China on Four Wheels (aired September 2012) and  Russia on Four Wheels (aired January 2014).

In 2012 Rani took part in BBC's Great Sport Relief Bake Off, winning the competition. In 2013, she co-presented the unique live broadcast project Airport Live from Heathrow Airport. In April 2014, she was one of the presenters of BBC Two's Escape to the Continent.

Since 2015 she has co-hosted BBC's Countryfile. Rani co-presented The World's Busiest Railway 2015, alongside Dan Snow and Robert Llewellyn. The four-part series aired on BBC Two. In 2016, she co-presented The Refugee Camp: Our Desert Home for BBC Two and presented This Morning for four Fridays in the summer alongside James Martin.

In 2016 Rani co-presented the three-part BBC Two series New York: America's Busiest City alongside Ant Anstead and Ade Adepitan. She presented My Family, Partition and Me: India 1947, a two-part programme on BBC One. She co-presented World's Busiest Cities in 2017 with Dan Snow and Ade Adepitan.

In 2018 she was honoured with Outstanding Achievement in Television at The Asian Awards. Rani also serves as an ambassador for The Scout Association in the UK.

Since 15 January 2021 Rani has presented the Friday and Saturday editions of BBC Radio 4's Woman's Hour.

On 24 February 2021 Rani was a guest on BBC Radio 4 interview show Gossip And Goddesses With Granny Kumar, where she said that her Indian name is Neetu, named after Indian actress Neetu Singh.

On 8 March 2021 Rani announced that she had been made a United Nations High Commissioner for Refugees Goodwill Ambassador.

In May 2021 Rani became the presenter of C4 daytime quiz show The Answer Trap.

In July 2021 Rani published her memoir The Right Sort of Girl, which made The Sunday Times Bestseller List.

In October 2022 Rani alongside Chris Bavin and Julie Ashfield presented Channel 4's 'Aldi's Next Big Thing'.

In November 2022, Rani was named as the new chancellor of the University of Bradford.

Strictly Come Dancing

Between October and December 2015, Rani participated in the thirteenth series of Strictly Come Dancing, partnered with Gleb Savchenko and reached the semi-final. In week 7 the couple scored 34 marks dancing a jive to "The Boy Does Nothing" by Alesha Dixon. In week 9, at the Blackpool Tower Ballroom, they danced a paso doble to "Malagueña" by Connie Francis and scored 37.

Rani hosted the 2017 Strictly Tour around Britain, replacing Mel Giedroyc.

Personal life
Rani lives in east London with her husband, Bhupinder Rehal, who is a technology executive for an advertising agency.

In August 2014, Rani was one of 200 public figures who were signatories to a letter to The Guardian opposing Scottish independence in the run-up to September's referendum on that issue.

Filmography

Network East Late (2003) – Co-presenter
Rogue Restaurants (2008) – Co-presenter
Watchdog (2009–2010) – Co-presenter
India on Four Wheels (2011) – Co-presenter
The One Show (2011–2012, 2014–present) – Stand-in presenter and reporter
Four Rooms (2011–2015) – Presenter
The Great Sport Relief Bake Off (2012) – Contestant
China on Four Wheels (2012) – Co-presenter
Airport Live (2013) – Co-presenter
No Sex Please, We're Japanese (2013) – Presenter
Russia on Four Wheels (2014) – Presenter
The Great Culture Quiz (2014) - Presenter
Escape to the Continent (2014–present) – Co-presenter
Countryfile (2015–present) – Co-presenter
The World's Busiest Railway (2015) – Co-presenter
Strictly Come Dancing (2015) – Contestant
The Refugee Camp: Our Desert Home (2016) – Co-presenter
This Morning Summer (2016) – Co-presenter
New York: America's Busiest City (2016) – Co-presenter
BBC Young Dancer (2017) – Co-presenter
One Love Manchester (2017) – Co-presenter
My Family, Partition and Me: India 1947 (2017) – Presenter
World's Busiest Cities (2017) – Co-presenter
Richard Osman's House of Games (2017) – Contestant
The Royal Wedding of Prince Harry and Meghan Markle (2018) – Guest Presenter
Bollywood: The World's Biggest Film Industry (2018) - Presenter and co-creator
Today at the Great Yorkshire Show (2019) – Co-presenter
Celebrity Gogglebox (2020) – Herself
The Chase Celebrity Special (2020) – Contestant
Blankety Blank Christmas Special (2020) – Contestant
The Victorian House of Arts and Crafts (2020) - Presenter 
James Martin’s Saturday Morning (2021) – Guest
A Service Of Celebration For Commonwealth Day (2021) - Presenter
Saved by a Stranger (2021–present) - Presenter
The Answer Trap (2021–present) – Presenter
Secret Spenders (2021–present) – Presenter
Britain By Beach (2021–present) – Presenter
The Wheel (2021) – Celebrity expert
All Star Musicals (2021) – Competitor
The Platinum Pageant (2022) – Reporter
Fastest Finger First (2022) – Host
The State Funeral of HM Queen Elizabeth II (2022) – Reporter
Aldi’s Next Big Thing (2022) – Co-presenter

Bibliography
 The Right Sort of Girl (2021)

See also 
 List of British Sikhs

References

External links
 
 Woman's Hour as BBC Radio 4
 Anita Rani profile as BBC The One Show
 Anita Rani profile at BBC Countryfile
 
 Anita Rani behind the scenes abseiling for BBC The One Show
 Family genealogy at thegenealogist.co.uk

1977 births
People from Bradford
Living people
Alumni of the University of Leeds
BBC Asian Network presenters
BBC Radio 4 presenters
BBC Radio 5 Live presenters
BBC Radio 6 Music presenters
BBC World Service presenters
Channel 4 people
British people of Indian descent
English people of Indian descent
English people of Punjabi descent
English radio presenters
English television presenters
People educated at Bradford Girls' Grammar School
Television personalities from West Yorkshire